Peter N. Miller (born December 13, 1964) is an American historian who is Dean of Bard College's Graduate Center. He was a 1998 MacArthur Fellow. Much of his scholarship has centered on the intellectual and cultural history of early modern Europe, including the practices of antiquarianism within wider scholarly erudition; and he is a particular authority on the thought and influence of the French savant, Nicolas-Claude Fabri de Peiresc (1580–1637).

From 1998 to 2001, he was an assistant professor at the University of Maryland, College Park.

He attended the Ramaz School, a Modern Orthodox Jewish day school in New York City. He earned his bachelor's degree magna cum laude from Harvard College, his master's from Harvard University and his PhD at the University of Cambridge.

Works
Sovereignty and Obligation in Republican England: political thought in the engagement controversy, Harvard University, 1986
From Community to Individual Rights: English political thought and imperial crisis 1750–1776, PhD thesis, University of Cambridge, 1990

Edited

References

1964 births
Writers from New York City
Bard College faculty
MacArthur Fellows
20th-century American Jews
Ramaz School alumni
University of Maryland, College Park faculty
Harvard University alumni
Alumni of the University of Cambridge
Living people
Historians from New York (state)
21st-century American Jews